{{DISPLAYTITLE:Pi5 Orionis}}

Pi5 Orionis (π5 Ori, π5 Orionis) is a binary star system in the constellation Orion. It has an apparent visual magnitude of 3.69, which is bright enough to be visible to the naked eye on a clear night. Based upon an annual parallax shift of 2.43 mas, it is around 1,300 light-years distant from the Sun.

This is a single-lined spectroscopic binary star system in a circular orbit with an orbital period of 3.7005 days. It is an ellipsoidal variable, which means the orbit is sufficiently close that the shapes of the components are being distorted by their mutual gravitation. This is causing the visual magnitude of the system to vary regularly by 0m.05 over the course of each orbit, as the orientation of the stars change with respect to the Earth.  Detailed analysis of the light curve suggests that the primary star is also pulsating and is probably a Slowly pulsating B-type star.

The primary component is a B-type giant star with a stellar classification of B2 III. It is only about 16 million years old and spins with a projected rotational velocity of 90 km/s. Despite the spectral class, the primary star is thought to be at or near the end of its main sequence evolution.

The secondary star is not detectable clearly, but modelling of the brightness variations and orbit suggest that it is a main sequence star with a spectral class of about B6.  It is smaller, cooler, and much less luminous than the primary, and orbits at about 26 astronomical units.

References

External links
 

B-type giants
Rotating ellipsoidal variables
Spectroscopic binaries
Orion (constellation)
Orionis, Pi5
Durchmusterung objects
Orionis, 08
031237
022797
1567